The men's heavyweight event was part of the boxing programme at the 1924 Summer Olympics. The weight class was the heaviest contested, allowing boxers weighing over 175 pounds (79.4 kilograms). The competition was held from Wednesday, July 16, 1924, to Sunday, July 20, 1924. Fifteen boxers from eleven nations competed.

Results

References

Sources
 

Heavyweight